The Women's omnium at the 2013 UCI Track Cycling World Championships was held February 23–24. 17 athletes participated in the contest. The final standings were determined by adding ranks in the six events.

Medalists

Individual event results

Flying Lap
250m flying start; the race was held at 15:50.

Points Race
The points race was 80 laps (20 km) with 8 sprints; the race was held at 17:20.

Elimination race
An elimination race ended day one; the race was held at 21:45.

Individual Pursuit
3 km individual pursuit started day two; the race was held at 10:00.

Scratch Race
A 10 km scratch race was the second event on day two; the race was held at 11:25.

500 m Time Trial
The last event was 500 m time trial; the race was held at 14:10.

Final standings
The final result after six events.

References

2013 UCI Track Cycling World Championships
UCI Track Cycling World Championships – Women's omnium
UCI